The 1992 NFL draft was the procedure by which National Football League teams selected amateur college football players. It is officially known as the NFL Annual Player Selection Meeting. The draft was held April 26–27, 1992, at the Marriott Marquis in New York City, New York. The league also held a supplemental draft after the regular draft and before the regular season.

The 1992 draft was notable because for the first time since 1958 one team, the Indianapolis Colts, held the first two overall picks, selecting defensive end Steve Emtman and then linebacker Quentin Coryatt. Neither made a major impact in the league, and the 1992 draft in retrospect is considered one of the worst in league history. It is the only draft since 1984 to produce no Pro Football Hall of Famers. It was also the final NFL Draft featuring twelve rounds of selections; the league would reduce the rounds to eight the following season, and then seven the year after that, where it has remained since.

Player selections

 

  

  

  

  

  

  

 

 

 

 

 

 
{{NFLDraft-row| draftyear=1992 | numberofrounds=12 | round=4 | picknum=104 | team=Atlanta Falcons | first=Frankie | last=Smith | dab=Frankie Smith (American football) | position=Cornerback | collegeyear=1991 | college=Baylor University | collegeteam=Baylor Bears | collegelink=Baylor | note=from Atlanta via New England and Dallas{{#tag:ref|No.104: multiple trades:No.104: Atlanta → New England (D). see No. 8: New England → Atlanta.No.104: New England → Dallas (D). see No. 13: Dallas → New England.No.104: Dallas → Atlanta (D).see No. 17: Atlanta → Dallas.|group="R4 -"}} | cfb page exists=yes }}

 

 

 
 

 

 

 

 

 
 

 

 

 

 
 

 

Notes

Supplemental draft

Hall of Famers
To date, no member of the 1992 NFL draft has been inducted into the Professional Football Hall of Fame.

Notable undrafted players

Trades
In the explanations below, (D) denotes trades that took place during the 1992 Draft, while (PD)''' indicates trades completed pre-draft.

Round one

Round two

Round three

Round four

Round five

Round six

Round seven

Round eight
--

References

External links
 NFL.com – 1992 Draft
 databaseFootball.com – 1992 Draft
 Pro Football Hall of Fame

National Football League Draft
NFL Draft
Draft
NFL Draft
NFL Draft
American football in New York City
1990s in Manhattan
Sporting events in New York City
Sports in Manhattan